San Fernando Club Deportivo Isleño is a Spanish football team based in San Fernando, Cádiz, in the autonomous community of Andalusia. Founded in 2009, it plays in Primera División RFEF – Group 1, holding home matches at Estadio Bahía Sur, with a capacity of 8,000 seats.

History
In June 2009, historical town club CD San Fernando - played one full decade in Segunda División - was dissolved due to insurmountable economic problems, being renamed San Fernando Club Deportivo. Another local outfit, Unión Sporting (founded in 2000), had its berth bought by the new organization, which started competing in Primera Andaluza. San Fernando's first game took place on 2 August 2009, against Sevilla Atlético at Bahía Sur, with the hosts winning 2–0. In its first season, 2009-10, San Fernando certified  promotion to Tercera División with a 1–8 away victory against CD San Roque in the last regular season game and knocking out CD Utrera in the promotion playoff.

The side first reached Tercera División in the 2010–11 season, finishing in second position in the regular season but being ousted in the playoffs by La Roda CF (two losses, 0–4 on aggregate). Finally the club reached Segunda División B in the next, 2011–2012 season.

Season to season

2 seasons in Primera División RFEF
7 seasons in Segunda División B
4 seasons in Tercera División

Current squad
.

Reserve team

Out on loan

References

External links
Official website 
Futbolme team profile 

Football clubs in Andalusia
Association football clubs established in 2009
2009 establishments in Spain
Primera Federación clubs
Sport in San Fernando, Cádiz